The 2017 Puerto Rico Soccer League season would be the 9th season as Puerto Rico's top-division football league.

League News

On January 31, 2017; At the headquarters of the Recreation and Sports Department, negotiations took place between Puerto Rico's top clubs and the Puerto Rican Football Federation (FPF) to outline the future of men's top football.
On February 22, 2017; The Puerto Rico Soccer League (PRSL) announced they will be celebrating their 3rd Cup of Excellence with 8 teams known to participate. The Cup of Excellence will begin from 28 to 30 April 2017 and end around June playing a single lap, carnival style, to save costs to teams.
Clubs(7/8) : Caguas Sporting FC, Ballista FC, FC Mayaguez, Bayamón FC, Club Deportivo Barbosa, and last years champion Metropolitan FA. Also newly created club Global Premier Soccer (GPS) Puerto Rico will be participating as well.
On February 23, 2017; Club Atlético Fajardo was confirmed to be  participating in the Excellence Cup III, becoming the 8th club to participate.
On March 1, 2017; Fraigcomar SC in the San Francisco neighborhood of San Juan returns for the first time since 2007 to a higher category and will be in the Excellence Cup III.
On March 29, 2017; A week before the cup began, PRSL announced that Academia Quintana had been accepted into the Cup of Excellence.
On Sept 4th 2017, the Puerto Rico Soccer League (PRSL) announced it will be holding its next tournament in conjunction with the efforts of the Puerto Rican Federation of Soccer (FPF) Competitions Commission which is scheduled to begin in early October this year. The unification tournament of the Commission of Competitions will be a temporary one for the professional project of first and second division in 2018 according to the new statutes of the FPF.

3rd Cup of Excellence
List of teams participating in this years 3rd annual Cup of Excellence.

Standings

Playoff Bracket

Statistical leaders

Top scorers

League awards

References

Puerto Rico Soccer League seasons
2017 in Puerto Rican football